Sara Bilumbu Luvunga (born 12 September 1999), known as Prado, is an Angolan footballer who plays as a midfielder for CD 1º de Agosto and the Angola women's national team.

Club career
Prado has played for Progresso Associação do Sambizanga and 1º de Agosto in Angola.

International career
Prado capped for Angola at senior level during two COSAFA Women's Championship editions (2020 and 2021).

References

1999 births
Living people
Angolan women's footballers
Women's association football midfielders
Progresso Associação do Sambizanga players
C.D. Primeiro de Agosto players
Angola women's international footballers